Hugh James Stevenson (born 21 June 1964) was a Scottish footballer who played for Dumbarton, Partick Thistle, Clydebank and Clyde.

References

1964 births
Scottish footballers
Dumbarton F.C. players
Partick Thistle F.C. players
Clydebank F.C. (1965) players
Clyde F.C. players
Scottish Football League players
Living people
Association football goalkeepers
Scottish Junior Football Association players
Linlithgow Rose F.C. players
People from Bridge of Allan
Footballers from Stirling (council area)